The Fordham–St. John's rivalry is an inter-conference rivalry between the Fordham Rams and the St. John's Red Storm who are both located in New York City: Fordham playing in The Bronx and St. John's playing in Queens. Conference-wise, the Rams play in the Atlantic 10 Conference (Patriot League for football), while the Red Storm play in the Big East Conference.

The rivalry is most prevalent in men's basketball, where the sides have met 88 times over the last century. The Red Storm have been dominant over that time, boasting a 69-19 record over the Rams. Included, a 23 game winning streak which lasted from 1972 through 1991, although Fordham has managed a few upsets since.  St. John's also dominates Fordham in women's basketball, boasting a 19-5 record overall although Fordham has split the last 6 contests. In other sports, the two teams generally meet less frequently, but there's still a buzz amongst students for such showdowns. Fordham had an advantage over St. John's in football, winning nearly two-thirds (9-6 record) of the head-to-head matches although the bulk of those affairs came with little pageantry as most came when the two schools were fielding D-III teams. The teams haven't played since 1988 and the series will remain dormant since St. John's disbanded its football team in 2002, thus allowing St. John’s to spend more resources on basketball while Fordham continues to support a D-1 football program. Fordham’s football rivalry is now with its Jesuit sister schools Georgetown and College of the Holy Cross, all three playing in the Patriot League.  The Bleacher Report states the major rival to St. John’s in the Big East is Seton Hall.  

To a certain extent a contention between the schools goes beyond sports. As the two largest Catholic universities in the region, containing the two largest green campuses in New York City, the institutions can be considered similar in look. 

The friendly friction is said to have started in the 19th century when both schools were known as St. John's College. Fordham was founded as the third oldest university in New York City by coadjutor bishop (later archbishop) of the Diocese of New York, John Hughes and named after Saint John the Baptist in 1841. When Hughes wished to expand and open a men's college, the Diocese did not wish to pursue that avenue for the Provincial and saw teaching in the college as a distraction to the young men studying for the priesthood.  Wishing to staff the seminary and a college, Hughes removed the Diocesan priests and invited the Jesuits to open the men's college.  The school, located in the Fordham section of The Bronx was deeded over to the Jesuits in 1846. In 1868, in the Bedford-Stuyvesant section of Brooklyn, Brooklyn Bishop John Loughlin invited the Vincentian Fathers to found a separate seminary for the young Brooklyn Diocese as well as St. John's College, both named after Saint John the Baptist. The Vincentians accepted.  In 1907 the Jesuit school was charted to be a  university and the St. John’s College name was dropped to use the town where it was located in the name, a practice common to Jesuit schools. Thus the Vincentian school (chartered as a full university in 1933) became the area's only "St. John's."  The university  moved to the Hillcrest section of Queens in 1956. Although the University is run by the Vincentians, a Dominican, Brian Shanley became  the President in 2021. Fordham, although run by the Jesuits since 1841, now has a lay president Tania Tetlow starting in 2022.

History 

Up until the CCNY_point-shaving_scandal, New York City was home to seven (St. John's, NYU, LIU, CCNY, Columbia, Fordham, Manhattan) major basketball programs. That transgression, referred to as "The City Dump Scandal" as well as an even bigger disgrace a decade later, simply known as the 1961 point-shaving scandal, greatly diminished New York City's standing as the epicenter of college hoops. Added to that, NYU's financial woes which had it scrap its basketball program after the 1971 season.

By the early 1980s only St. John's remained on the national stage as each of the other six schools had already transitioned to smaller D-I status or were relegated into the D-III ranks. Fordham, having qualified into 8 NIT and 1 NCAA tournament during the 1980s and early '90s, was the strongest of the six and the only to meet St. John's regularly throughout the 20th century. In fact the Rams met the Red Storm into the early 2000s until a brief hiatus following the 2003 season. The series resumed in 2009 and became heated when in 2013, St. John's sophomore, Chris Obekpa, made headlines for remarks on Fordham. He described  Fordham is a place for New York City basketball players to go that are not accepted by St. John's. Obekpa said he played with several of the Fordham players in high school and that "they are mad that they are not here. Playing us is their opportunity to prove a point". The next day, St. John's would go on to defeat Fordham 104-58, making it the most lopsided result in the series history.  Fordham draws some solace in that it has always ranked higher academically (in 2022 US News and World Report ranked Fordham at 66th, St.John’s at 172nd) and it’s Football team won more games; continuing its football program while St. John’s discontinued theirs.  As such the rivalry is centered on basketball. 

St. John's won in another blowout the following year but when Fordham turned the tables in 2015, drama spewed between the two men's basketball coaches. St. John's reaffirmed its position as top team with a 28 point win in 2016. The sides haven't met on the court since but the rivalry continues in smaller non-revenue sports, particularly softball where the schools have consistently battled since the 2009 season.

College comparison

All-time results

Summary 

Series led and games won by Fordham are shaded ██ maroon. Series led and games won by St. John's shaded ██ red.

Baseball

Basketball

Men's basketball

Women's basketball

Football 

Fordham, originally known as St. John's College of Rose Hill, began their football program in 1882.  Playing at a small school level, early opposition came from local athletic clubs, military and naval units, YMCA groups and even its own reserve team. When up against other colleges, Fordham's main rivals were Xavier (a school which later dropped its college division but still exists as a high school and to this day is a rival of Fordham Prep), CCNY, Saint Peter's and Seton Hall. The school officially changed its name to Fordham University before the 1908 season and by then they had already sprinkled in a few more established teams, like NYU, Columbia, Rutgers, Princeton, Cornell and Syracuse, to their schedule. For the most however, Fordham still played a small school schedule until the 1920s. Early in that decade they made a slight move up to what today would best be called the D-II level while mostly scheduling other elite Catholic schools like Boston College, Holy Cross, Villanova and Georgetown. By decade's end they made another and far more drastic jump into what we today call the D-I/FBS level.

From 1929 to 1942 the Rams reeled off 14 straight winning seasons while often playing in front of near capacity crowds at the 55,000 seat Polo Grounds. During that era only Alabama had a higher winning percentage in all of major level college football. National college polls began after the 1935 season where Fordham finished with a Top-20 ranking.  They followed that with six straight additional Top-20 rankings from 1936 to 1941. Only Duke also finished in the Top-20 in each of those first seven years of post-season polls. Also included during Fordham's run was the formation of the famed "Seven Blocks of Granite" during the 1936 and 1937 seasons, participating in the first ever televised football game in 1939, a Cotton Bowl appearance in 1940 and a Sugar Bowl win in 1941.

Like many other schools, Fordham put their program on hiatus while the country fought WWII. Rams football returned in 1946 but on a deemphasized basis. Still in the FBS level, Fordham replaced their national schedule with a more regional one. Despite leading the country in passing in 1949, and again in 1952, and almost landing a spot into the 1950 Gator Bowl, results were mixed at best during the post-war years. Attendance declined drastically, perhaps the result of not only an inferior product on the field but also white-flight and the rise of television. After a horrific 1-7-1 season in 1954, where Fordham only drew about 12,000 per game, the program was scrapped.

The sport remained absent from campus life until 1964 when students formed a club team. Decent success at the game's lowest level, including a club football national championship in 1968, allowed the university to bring football back to varsity status for the 1970 season. There they played at what would become the D-III level where in 1987 the Rams landed a spot in the D-III playoffs. That success propelled the school to jump to the I-AA (now known as FCS) level in 1989. The promotion into the Division I subdivision proved unsuccessful for over a decade as it took until 2001 for Fordham to finish with a winning record. Since then things have changed dramatically as the Rams qualified into the 2002, 2007, 2013, 2014 and 2015 playoffs. Despite never winning an FCS national championship, Fordham has finished in the Top-20 in each of those seasons as well.

St. John's, originally known as St. John's College of Brooklyn, began their football program in 1895. Located inside two buildings within the Bedford-Stuyvesant section of Brooklyn, and lacking a green campus, St. John's staged their home games on makeshift fields at the Prospect Park Parade Grounds. Playing at the absolute smallest of levels, most competition came local athletic clubs and even local high schools. This included Fordham Prep which went 2-0 against St. John's during their early football years. Simply fielding a team itself proved somewhat difficult as St. John's spent those early years sporadically dropping and restarting their program.

Finally, in 1923 the school made a more sincere effort to build a true football program. Although continuing play at a small level, new schedules against secondary Catholic schools like Providence and Niagara were an improvement to previous ones featuring high school teams. Saint John's moved their home games to 30,000 seat Ebbet's Field and despite only averaging about 3,000 fans per game, they did schedule a few intriguing contests against more established programs like Fordham and Holy Cross. Even defeating Fordham in 1923 and playing Holy Cross close in 1925 did little to create much in public support and in 1929 St. John's moved their home games to Dexter Field, a minor league baseball park in Woodhaven, Queens. Although attendance improved to about 5,000 per game, football continued to lose money and the program was discontinued following the 1931 season.

In 1956 the entire university moved to a large, green campus in Hillcrest, Queens. Set on what had previously been a golf course, the new campus suddenly offered St. John's the space to build an authentic campus. In 1965, a year after Fordham students created a club team, St. John's students did the same. Their first game back came against Manhattan College, who coincidentally, had also served as St. John's last opponent before eliminating football in 1931. Manhattan had won that 1931 encounter, 8-7, but 34 years later, St. John's avenged that loss with a 19-8 victory. The team remained mostly successful at the club level and played for a regional championship in 1974 before finally receiving varsity status prior to the 1978 season. Playing at the D-III level, St. John's again remained mostly successful. Although they never advanced to the D-III playoffs, they did qualify into regional ECAC bowls in 1983 and again in 1989.

In 1993 the "Dayton Rule” disallowed D-I schools from playing lower level football. Instead, these schools, including St. John's, were forced into the I-AA (now FCS) level despite not truly being able to fund I-AA programs. While these schools were able to band together and avoid competition against legitimate FCS teams, none was ever ranked or invited into the FCS playoffs during those early years. Instead, they were considered “Mid-Majors” and the best they could muster in post-season play involved regional ECAC bowls. Much like they had done as a D-III, St. John's qualified into the 1994 ECAC-IFC championship game and after previous defeats, won their first post-season game ever. Over the next decade however the "Mid-Major” ranks began disappearing as many of the former D-III schools started the slow process of building legitimate FCS programs. Others chose to instead drop the sport entirely. St. John's chose the latter and terminated their program after the 2002 season.

Soccer

Men's soccer 

Fordham's men's soccer program began in 1956, while St. John's program began in 1979. The Red Storm first played Fordham in 1980, as inter-conference opponents of the Tri-State Soccer Conference. In 1985, St. John's moved to the Big East Conference, while Fordham moved to the MAAC. The two teams met in the first round of the 1996 NCAA Division I Men's Soccer Tournament, where St. John's won 5-1 en route to an NCAA championship. The 2017 affair saw Fordham defeat St. John's for the first time since 1990.  After a short hiatus St. John's won the rematch in 2021.

Women's soccer

Softball 

St. John's softball program began in 1981. The following year they won the New York State (AIAW) Championship. As a regional power they qualified into the championship round of the 1988 and 1989 ECAC Tournaments, falling on both occasions. The Big East began sponsoring softball the following year and during that inaugural season St. John's was once again a post-season finalist before again bowing out. Afterwards St. John's slipped into a long era of mediocrity. The Red Storm did not again advance to the Big East championship round until 2014, where once again, they came up short. With head coach, Amy Kvilhaug returning a solid core, St. John's came back to sweep through the Big East regular season and post-season in 2015, giving them their first crown since 1982. The post-season tournament win also secured an automatic bid into the NCAA tournament, the first ever for the Johnnies. St. John's continued their winning ways while advancing into the Big East tournament's final round in both 2016 and 2017. Both times however they came up short and were not able to land at-large bids into the NCAA tournament. Despite another winning season in 2018, the Red Storm took a slight step back while failing to reach the conference's final round for the first time in five years. Coach Kvilhaug stepped down after the season and was replaced with longtime assistant, Bob Guerriero. During his first year at the helm, Guerriero guided St. John's to another Big East regular season crown in 2019 although they again came up short in the league's post-season tournament.  

Fordham's softball program began in 1985. They played in the MAAC until the school changed conference affiliation to the Patriot League following the 1990 season. The Patriot League stint only lasted five years before the school again changed affiliation, this time to the Atlantic 10 in 1996. Before that Fordham suffered through 10 losing seasons, one .500 season and zero winning seasons. Initially, the jump to the A-10 only made matters worse, where Fordham haplessly struggled to a 12-60 combined record during 1996 and 1997. The run of incompetence continued until head coach, Bridget Baxter, was hired to turn things around following the 2001 season. After another losing campaign in 2002, Fordham finally posted their first winning mark in 2003. It was their first of what would become 16 straight winning seasons for Baxter (later known by her married name, Bridget Orchard) at Fordham. In that time Orchard took the Rams to the NCAA tournament 8 times. Their first appearance came in 2010 as an at-large bid. That was followed with post-season A-10 conference titles and automatic NCAA bids in 2011, 2013, 2014, 2015, 2016, 2017 and 2018. Ironically, their one miss during the run was in 2012 when Fordham posted its most impressive win ever, an 8-5 victory over then 3rd ranked Alabama. The Crimson Tide would go on to win the national title later that same season. 

While success at the NCAA's has eluded Fordham, the Rams have evolved into the region's top softball program. During the 2010s, no other Northeastern squad has qualified into the NCAA tournament as often as Fordham. Following the 2018 season Coach Orchard left Fordham to take the same position at her alma mater, Villanova. She was replaced by former Iona head coach, Melissa Inouye, who in 2019 continued Fordham's success with another Atlantic 10 title and automatic NCAA tournament bid.

References

External links 
Fordham Athletics
St. John's Athletics

College basketball rivalries in the United States
College soccer rivalries in the United States
College sports rivalries in the United States
College sports in New York City
Fordham Rams
St. John's Red Storm